Gwladus Ddu, ("Gwladus the Dark Eyes"), full name Gwladus ferch Llywelyn (died 1251) was a Welsh noblewoman who was a daughter of Llywelyn the Great of Gwynedd and Joan Plantagenet, a daughter of John, King of England. She married two Marcher lords.

Sources differ as to whether Gwladus was Llywelyn's legitimate daughter by his wife Joan or an illegitimate daughter by Tangwystl Goch, but she is widely regarded to be the daughter of Joan. Gwladus is recorded in Brut y Tywysogion as having died at Windsor in 1251.

Marriage

 She married firstly, Reginald de Braose, Lord of Brecon and Abergavenny in about 1215.  After Reginald's death in 1228 she was probably the sister recorded as accompanying Dafydd ap Llywelyn to London in 1229.
 She married secondly, Ralph de Mortimer of Wigmore about 1230. Ralph died in 1246, and their son, Roger de Mortimer, inherited the lordship.

Issue

 Roger Mortimer, 1st Baron Mortimer, in 1247, married Maud de Braose, by whom he had seven children.
 Hugh de Mortimer (d. 1273), lord of Chelmarsh.
 Peter or John Mortimer, a Franciscan friar in Shrewsbury.

References

Notes
 Ancestral Roots of Certain American Colonists Who Came to America Before 1700 by Frederick Lewis Weis; Lines 132-C-29, 176B-28
 John Edward Lloyd (1911)  A history of Wales from the earliest times to the Edwardian conquest (Longmans, Green & Co.)

1251 deaths
Welsh princesses
Year of birth unknown
13th-century Welsh nobility
13th-century Welsh women